Tímea Paksy (born 22 January 1983) is a Hungarian sprint canoer who has competed since the early 2000s. She won eighteen medals at the ICF Canoe Sprint World Championships with nine golds (K-1 200 m: 2006, K-2 200 m: 2003, K-2 1000 m: 2003, K-4 200 m: 2002, 2006; K-4 500 m: 2006, K-4 1000 m: 2005, 2006, 2007), six silvers (K-1 4 x 200 m: 2009, 2010; K-2 500 m: 2007, K-4 200 m: 2007, 2009; K-4 500 m: 2007), and three bronzes (K-1 200 m: 2003, K-4 500 m: 2005, K-4 1000 m: 2002).

References
Canoe09.ca profile 

NBC 2008 Olympics profile

1983 births
Hungarian female canoeists
Living people
ICF Canoe Sprint World Championships medalists in kayak